Dina Tehsil is an administrative subdivision (tehsil) of Jhelum District in the Punjab province of Pakistan. The city of Dina is the headquarters of the tehsil. It is named after a saint Baba Dina Shaeed whose tomb lies near GT road in the Domeli Mohalla.

Union Councils 
Dina Tehsil is subdivided into 11 Union Councils:
 Ladhar
 Mughlabad

 Danyala
Madukalas
Dina 1
Dina 2
Garh Mahal
Sohan
Badlot
Janjeel
Khukha

References

Dina Tehsil
Tehsils of Jhelum District
Jhelum District
Tehsils of Punjab, Pakistan